The Atari Jaguar is a home video game console developed by Atari Corporation and  released in North America in November 1993. Part of the fifth generation of video game consoles, it competed with the 16-bit Sega Genesis, the Super NES and the 32-bit 3DO Interactive Multiplayer that launched the same year. Powered by two custom 32-bit Tom and in addition to a Motorola 68000, Atari marketed it as the world's first 64-bit game system, emphasizing its 64-bit bus used by the blitter.  The Jaguar launched with Cybermorph as the pack-in game, which received divisive reviews. The system's library ultimately comprised only 50 licensed games.

Development of the Atari Jaguar started in the early 1990s by Flare Technology, which focused on the system after cancellation of the Atari Panther console. The multi-chip architecture, hardware bugs, and poor tools made writing games for the Jaguar difficult. Underwhelming sales further eroded the console's third-party support.

Atari attempted to extend the lifespan of the system with the Atari Jaguar CD add-on, with an additional 13 games, and emphasizing the Jaguar's price of over  less than its competitors. With the release of the Sega Saturn and PlayStation in 1995, sales of the Jaguar continued to fall. It sold no more than 150,000 units before it was discontinued in 1996. The commercial failure of the Jaguar prompted Atari to leave the console market.

After Hasbro Interactive acquired all Atari Corporation properties, the patents of the Jaguar were released into the public domain, with the console declared an open platform. Since its discontinuation, hobbyists have produced games for the system.

History

Development
The Jaguar was developed by the members of Flare Technology, a company formed by Martin Brennan and John Mathieson. The team had claimed that they could not only make a console superior to the Genesis or the Super NES, but they could also be cost-effective. Impressed by their work on the Konix Multisystem, Atari persuaded them to close Flare and form a new company called Flare II, with Atari providing the funding. Flare II initially set to work designing two consoles for Atari. One was a 32-bit architecture (codenamed Panther), and the other was a 64-bit system (codenamed Jaguar). Work on the Jaguar design progressed faster than expected, so Atari canceled the Panther project to focus on the more promising Jaguar.

The Jaguar was unveiled in August 1993 at the Chicago Consumer Entertainment Show. To prepare for its launch, the Atari ST computer line was discontinued, and support for earlier systems such as the Atari 2600 and Atari 8-bit family, had already been dropped on January 1, 1992.

Launch
The Jaguar was launched on November 23, 1993, at a price of $249.99, under a $500 million manufacturing deal with IBM. The system was initially available only in the test markets of New York City and San Francisco, with the slogan "Get bit by Jaguar", claiming superiority over competing 16-bit and 32-bit systems. During this test launch Atari sold all units hoping it would rally support for the system. A nationwide release followed six months later, in early 1994. The Jaguar struggled to attain a substantial user base. Atari reported that it had shipped 17,000 units as part of the system's initial test market in 1993. By the end of 1994, it reported that it had sold approximately 100,000 units.

Computer Gaming World wrote in January 1994 that the Jaguar was "a great machine in search of a developer/customer base", as Atari had to "overcome the stigma of its name (lack of marketing and customer support, as well as poor developer relations in the past)". Atari had "ventured late into third party software support" for the Jaguar while competing console 3DO's "18 month public relations blitz" would result in "an avalanche of software support", the magazine reported. The small size and poor quality of the Jaguar's game library became the most commonly cited reason for the Jaguar's tepid adoption, as early releases like Trevor McFur in the Crescent Galaxy, Raiden, and Evolution: Dino Dudes also received poor reviews, the latter two for failing to take full advantage of the Jaguar's hardware.  Jaguar did eventually earn praise with games such as Tempest 2000, Doom, and Wolfenstein 3D. The most successful title during the Jaguar's first year was Alien vs. Predator. However, these occasional successes were seen as insufficient while the Jaguar's competitors were receiving a continual stream of critically acclaimed software; GamePro concluded their rave review of Alien vs. Predator by remarking "If Atari can turn out a dozen more games like AvP, Jaguar owners could truly rest easy and enjoy their purchase."  Next Generation commented that "thus far, Atari has spectacularly failed to deliver on the software side, leaving many to question the actual quality and capability of the hardware. With only one or two exceptions – Tempest 2000 is cited most frequently – there have just been no truly great games for the Jaguar up to now." They further noted that while Atari is well known by older gamers, the company had much less overall brand recognition than Sega, Sony, Nintendo, or even The 3DO Company. However, they argued that with its low price point, the Jaguar might still compete if Atari could improve the software situation.

Bit count controversy
Atari tried to downplay competing consoles by proclaiming the Jaguar was the only "64-bit" system. This claim is questioned by some, because the Motorola 68000 CPU and the Tom and Jerry coprocessors execute 32-bit instruction sets. Atari's reasoning that the 32-bit Tom and Jerry chips work in tandem to add up to a 64-bit system was ridiculed in a mini-editorial by Electronic Gaming Monthly, which commented that "If Sega did the math for the Sega Saturn the way Atari did the math for their 64-bit Jaguar system, the Sega Saturn would be a 112-bit monster of a machine." Next Generation, while giving a mostly negative review of the Jaguar, maintained that it is a true 64-bit system, since the data path from the DRAM to the CPU and Tom and Jerry chips is 64 bits wide.

Arrival of Saturn and PlayStation
In early 1995, Atari announced that they had dropped the price of the Jaguar to $149.99, in order to be more competitive. Atari ran infomercials with enthusiastic salesmen touting the game system. These aired for most of 1995, but did not sell the remaining stock of Jaguar systems.

In a 1995 interview with Next Generation, then-CEO Sam Tramiel declared that the Jaguar was as powerful, if not more powerful, than the newly launched Sega Saturn, and slightly weaker than the upcoming PlayStation. Next Generation received a deluge of letters in response to Tramiel's comments, particularly his threat to bring Sony to court for price dumping if the PlayStation entered the U.S. market at a retail price below $300. Many readers found this threat hollow and hypocritical, since Tramiel noted in the same interview that Atari was selling the Jaguar at a loss. The editor responded that price dumping does not have to do with a product being priced below cost, but its being priced much lower in one country than anotherwhich, as Tramiel said, is illegal. Tramiel and Next Generation agreed that the PlayStation's Japanese price converts to approximately $500. His remark that the small number of third party Jaguar games was good for Atari's profitability, angered Jaguar owners who were already frustrated at how few games were coming out for the system.

In Atari's 1995 annual report, it noted:  In addition, Atari had severely limited financial resources, and so could not create the level of marketing which has historically backed successful gaming consoles.

Decline
By November 1995, mass layoffs and insider statements were fueling journalistic speculation that Atari had ceased both development and manufacturing for the Jaguar and was simply trying to sell off existing stock before exiting the video game industry. Although Atari continued to deny these theories going into 1996, core Jaguar developers such as High Voltage Software and Beyond Games stated that they were no longer receiving communications from Atari regarding future Jaguar projects.

In its 10-K405 SEC Filing, filed April 12, 1996, Atari informed stockholders that its revenues had declined by more than half, from $38.7 million in 1994 to $14.6 million in 1995, then gave them the news on the truly dire nature of the Jaguar:

The filing confirmed that Atari had abandoned the Jaguar in November 1995 and in the subsequent months were concerned chiefly with liquidating its inventory of Jaguar products. On April 8, 1996, Atari Corporation agreed to merge with JTS, Inc. in a reverse takeover, thus forming JTS Corporation. The merger was finalized on July 30.

After the merger, the bulk of Jaguar inventory remained unsold and would be finally moved out to Tiger Software, a private liquidator, on December 23, 1996. On March 13, 1998, JTS sold the Atari name and all of the Atari properties to Hasbro Interactive.

Technical specifications
From the Jaguar Software Reference manual, page 1:

Design specs for the console allude to the GPU or DSP being capable of acting as a CPU, leaving the Motorola 68000 to read controller inputs. Atari's Leonard Tramiel also specifically suggested that the 68000 not be used by developers. In practice, however, many developers use the Motorola 68000 to drive gameplay logic due to the greater developer familiarity of the 68000 and the adequacy of the 68000 for certain types of games. Most critically, a flaw in the memory controller means that certain obscure conventions must be followed for the RISC chips to be able to execute code from RAM.

Processors
 Tom chip, 26.59 MHz
 Graphics processing unit (GPU) – 32-bit RISC architecture, 4 KB internal RAM, all graphical effects are software-based, with additional instructions intended for 3D operations
 Object Processor – 64-bit fixed-function video processor, converts display lists to video output at scan time.
 Blitter – 64-bit high speed logic operations, z-buffering and Gouraud shading, with 64-bit internal registers.
 DRAM controller, 8-, 16-, 32- and 64-bit memory management
 Jerry chip, 26.59 MHz
 Digital Signal Processor – 32-bit RISC architecture, 8 KB internal RAM
 Similar RISC core as the GPU, additional instructions intended for audio operations
 CD-quality sound (16-bit stereo)
 Number of sound channels limited by software
 Two DACs (stereo) convert digital data to analog sound signals
 Full stereo capabilities
 Wavetable synthesis and AM synthesis
 A clock control block, incorporating timers, and a UART
 Joystick control
 Motorola 68000 - system processor "used as a manager".
 General purpose 16-/32-bit control processor, 13.295 MHz

Other features

 RAM: 2 MB on a 64-bit bus using 4 16-bit fast-page-mode DRAMs (80 ns)
 Storage: ROM cartridges – up to 6 MB
 DSP-port (JagLink)
 Monitor-port (composite/S-Video/RGB)
 Antenna-port (UHF/VHF) - fixed at 591 MHz in Europe; not present on French model
 Support for ComLynx I/O
 NTSC/PAL machines can be identified by their power LED colour, Red: NTSC; Green: PAL.

COJAG arcade games
Atari Games licensed the Atari Jaguar's chipset for use in its arcade games. The system, named COJAG (for "Coin-Op Jaguar"), replaced the 68000 with a 68020 or MIPS R3000-based CPU (depending on the board version), added more RAM, a full 64-bit wide ROM bus (Jaguar ROM bus being 32-bit), and optionally a hard drive (some games such as Freeze are ROM only). It runs the lightgun games Area 51 and Maximum Force, which were released by Atari as dedicated cabinets or as the Area 51 and Maximum Force combo machine. Other games were developed but never released: 3 On 3 Basketball, Fishin' Frenzy, Freeze, and Vicious Circle.

Peripherals

Prior to the launch of the console in November 1993, Atari had announced a variety of peripherals to be released over the console's lifespan. This includes a CD-ROM-based console, a dial-up Internet link with support for online gaming, a virtual reality headset, and an MPEG-2 video card. However, due to the poor sales and eventual commercial failure of the Jaguar, most of the peripherals in development were canceled. The only peripherals and add-ons released by Atari for the Jaguar are a redesigned controller, an adapter for four players, a CD console add-on, and a link cable for local area network (LAN) gaming.

The redesigned second controller, the ProController by Atari, added three more face buttons and two triggers. It was created in response to the criticism of the original controller, said to lack enough buttons for fighting games in particular. Sold independently, however, it was never bundled with the system. The Team Tap multitap adds 4-controller support, compatible only with the optionally bundled White Men Can't Jump and NBA Jam Tournament Edition. Eight player gameplay with two Team Taps is possible but unsupported by those games. For LAN multiplayer support, the Jaglink Interface links two Jaguar consoles through a modular extension and a UTP phone cable. It is compatible with three games: AirCars, BattleSphere, and Doom.

In 1994 at the CES, Atari announced that it had partnered with Phylon, Inc. to create the Jaguar Voice/Data Communicator. The unit was delayed and an estimated 100 units were produced, but eventually in 1995 was canceled. The Jaguar Voice Modem or JVM utilizes a 19.9 kbit/s dial up modem to answer incoming phone calls and store up to 18 phone numbers. Players directly dial each other for online play, only compatible with Ultra Vortek which initializes the modem by entering 911 on the key pad at startup.

Jaguar CD

The Jaguar CD is a CD-ROM peripheral for games. It was released in September 1995, two years after the Jaguar's launch. Thirteen CD games were released during its manufacturing lifetime, with more being made later by homebrew developers. Each Jaguar CD unit has a Virtual Light Machine, which displays light patterns corresponding to music, if the user inserts an audio CD into the console. It was developed by Jeff Minter, after experimenting with graphics during the development of Tempest 2000. The program was deemed a spiritual successor to the Atari Video Music, a visualizer released in 1976.

The Memory Track is a cartridge accessory for the Jaguar CD, providing Jaguar CD games with 128 K EEPROM for persistent storage of data such as preferences and saved games. The Atari Jaguar Duo (codenamed Jaguar III) was a proposal to integrate the Jaguar CD to make a new console, a concept similar to the TurboDuo and Genesis CDX. A prototype, described by journalists as resembling a bathroom scale, was unveiled at the 1995 Winter Consumer Electronics Show, but the console was canceled before production.

Jaguar VR
A virtual reality headset compatible with the console, tentatively titled the Jaguar VR, was unveiled by Atari at the 1995 Winter Consumer Electronics Show. The development of the peripheral was a response to Nintendo's virtual reality console, the Virtual Boy, which had been announced the previous year. The headset was developed in cooperation with Virtuality, which had previously created many virtual reality arcade systems, and was already developing a similar headset for practical purposes, named Project Elysium, for IBM. The peripheral was targeted for a commercial release before Christmas 1995. However, the deal with Virtuality was abandoned in October 1995. After Atari's merger with JTS in 1996, all prototypes of the headset were allegedly destroyed. However, two working units, one low-resolution prototype with red and grey-colored graphics and one high-resolution prototype with blue and grey-colored graphics, have since been recovered, and are regularly showcased at retrogaming-themed conventions and festivals. Only one game was developed for the Jaguar VR prototype: a 3D-rendered version of the 1980 arcade game Missile Command, titled Missile Command 3D, and a demo of Virtuality's Zone Hunter was created.

Unlicensed peripherals
An unofficial expansion peripheral for the Atari Jaguar dubbed the "Catbox" was released by the Rockford, Illinois company ICD. It was originally slated to be released early in the Jaguar's life, in the second quarter of 1994, but was not actually released until mid-1995. The ICD CatBox plugs directly into the AV/DSP connectors located in the rear of the Jaguar console and provides three main functions. These are audio, video, and communications. It features six output formats, three for audio (line level stereo, RGB monitor, headphone jack with volume control) and three for video (composite, S-Video, and RGB analog component video) making the Jaguar compatible with multiple high quality monitor systems and multiple monitors at the same time. It is capable of communications methods known as CatNet and RS-232 as well as DSP pass through, allowing the user to connect two or more Jaguars together for multiplayer games either directly or with modems. The ICD CatBox features a polished stainless steel casing and red LEDs in the jaguar's eyes on the logo that indicate communications activity. An IBM AT-type null modem cable may be used to connect two Jaguars together. The CatBox is also compatible with Atari's Jaglink Interface peripheral.

An adaptor for the Jaguar that allows for WebTV access was revealed in 1998; one prototype is known to exist.

Game library

Reception

Reviewing the Jaguar just a few weeks prior to its launch, GamePro gave it a "thumbs sideways". They praised the power of the hardware but criticized the controller, and were dubious of how the software lineup would turn out, commenting that Atari's failure to secure support from key third party publishers such as Capcom was a bad sign. They concluded that "Like the 3DO, the Jaguar is a risky investment – just not quite as expensive."

The Jaguar won GameFan'''s "Best New System" award for 1993.

The small size and poor quality of the Jaguar's game library became the most commonly cited reason for its failure in the marketplace. The pack-in game Cybermorph was one of the first polygon-based games for consoles, but was criticized for design flaws and a weak color palette, and compared unfavorably with the SNES's Star Fox. Other early releases like Trevor McFur in the Crescent Galaxy, Raiden, and Evolution: Dino Dudes also received poor reviews, the latter two for failing to take full advantage of the Jaguar's hardware.  Jaguar did eventually earn praise with games such as Tempest 2000, Doom, and Wolfenstein 3D. The most successful title during the Jaguar's first year was Alien vs. Predator. However, these occasional successes were seen as insufficient while the Jaguar's competitors were receiving a continual stream of critically acclaimed software; GamePro concluded their rave review of Alien vs. Predator by remarking "If Atari can turn out a dozen more games like AvP, Jaguar owners could truly rest easy and enjoy their purchase." In late 1995 reviews of the Jaguar, Game Players remarked, "The Jaguar suffers from several problems, most importantly the lack of good software." and Next Generation likewise commented that "thus far, Atari has spectacularly failed to deliver on the software side, leaving many to question the actual quality and capability of the hardware. With only one or two exceptions – Tempest 2000 is cited most frequently – there have just been no truly great games for the Jaguar up to now." They further noted that while Atari is well known by older gamers, the company had much less overall brand recognition than Sega, Sony, Nintendo, or even The 3DO Company. However, they argued that with its low price point, the Jaguar might still compete if Atari could improve the software situation. They gave the system two out of five stars. Game Players also stated the despite being 64-bit, the Jaguar is much less powerful than the 3DO, Saturn, and PlayStation, even when supplemented with the Jaguar CD. With such a small library of games to challenge the incumbent 16-bit game consoles, Jaguar's appeal never grew beyond a small gaming audience. Digital Spy commented: "Like many failed hardware ventures, it still maintains something of a cult following but can only be considered a misstep for Atari."

In 2006 IGN editor Craig Harris rated the original Jaguar controller as the worst game controller ever, criticizing the unwarranted recycling of the 1980s "phone keypad" format and the small number of action buttons, which he found particularly unwise given that Atari was actively trying to court fighting game fans to the system. Ed Semrad of Electronic Gaming Monthly commented that many Jaguar games gratuitously used all of the controller's phone keypad buttons, making the controls much more difficult than they needed to be. GamePros The Watch Dog remarked, "The controller usually doesn't use the keypad, and for games that use the keypad extensively (Alien vs. Predator, Doom), a keypad overlay is used to minimize confusion. But yes, it is a lot of buttons for nuttin'." Atari added more action buttons for its Pro Controller, to improve performance in fighting games in particular.

Legacy

Telegames continued to publish games for the Jaguar after it was discontinued, and for a time was the only company to do so. On May 14, 1999, Hasbro Interactive announced that it had released all patents to the Jaguar, declaring it an open platform; this opened the doors for extensive homebrew development. Following the announcement, Songbird Productions joined Telegames in releasing unfinished Jaguar games alongside new games to satisfy the cult following. Hasbro Interactive, along with all the Atari properties, was sold to Infogrames on January 29, 2001.

In the United Kingdom in 2001, Telegames and retailer Game made a deal to bring the Jaguar to Game's retail outlets. It was initially sold for £29.99 new and software ranged between £9.99 for more common games such as Doom and Ruiner Pinball and £39.99 for rarer releases such as Defender 2000 and Checkered Flag. The machine had a presence in the stores until 2007, when remaining consoles were sold off for £9.99 and games were sold for as low as 97p.

In 1997, Imagin Systems, a manufacturer of dental imaging equipment, purchased the Jaguar cartridge and console molds, including the molds for the CD add-on, from JTS. The console molds could, with minor modification, fit their HotRod camera, and the cartridge molds were reused to create an optional memory expansion card. In December 2014, the molds were purchased from Imagin Systems by Mike Kennedy, owner of the Kickstarter funded Retro Videogame Magazine'', to propose a new crowdfunded video game console, the Retro VGS, later rebranded the Coleco Chameleon after entering a licensing agreement with Coleco. The purchase of the molds was far cheaper than designing and manufacturing entirely new molds, and Kennedy described their acquisition as "the entire reason [the Retro VGS] is possible". However, the project was terminated in March 2016 following criticism of Kennedy and doubts regarding demand for the proposed console. Two "prototypes" were discovered to be fakes and Coleco withdrew from the project. After the project's termination, the molds were sold to Albert Yarusso, the founder of the AtariAge website.

See also
 Contiki, portable operating system, including a port for the Jaguar with GUI, TCP/IP, and web browser support.
 Retro VGS

References

External links

 
 Atari Jaguar review, 1994

Products introduced in 1993
Products and services discontinued in 1996
Jaguar duo
Home video game consoles
Fifth-generation video game consoles
1990s toys
68k-based game consoles